Jeremy Clarke may refer to:

 Jeremy Clarke (poet) (born 1962), British poet
 Jeremy Clarke (governor) (1605–1652), colonial settler and President of the Colony of Rhode Island and Providence Plantations

See also
 Jeremy Clark (born 1983), American football defensive end
 Jeremy Clark (defensive back) (born 1994), American football defensive back